WWE The Music, Volume 8 is a compilation album released by WWE on March 25, 2008. Unlike Volume 7, which was released exclusively on iTunes, Volume 8 was sold as a CD (much like other WWE music albums) in addition to being offered on iTunes.

Track listing
All tracks were written by Jim Johnston.

Three bonus tracks sold exclusively through Wal-Mart include:

Release history

See also

Music in professional wrestling

References

WWE albums
2008 compilation albums
Rock compilation albums
Hip hop compilation albums
2008 soundtrack albums